Dianne Buckner is a former Canadian television journalist, best known as a host of business-oriented programming, such as Venture and Dragons' Den, on CBC Television and CBC News Network.
 
Buckner has also been a guest anchor on CBC news programs such as CBC News: Sunday, Midday and As It Happens, and has served as a back-up anchor on CBC News Network. She previously worked for CTV, where she hosted the consumer awareness program Live It Up! and was a reporter for Canada AM and CTV National News.

She became host of Venture in 1997, succeeding Robert Scully.

She has been a four-time Gemini Award nominee, receiving nods for Best Host or Interviewer in a News Information Program or Series at the 19th Gemini Awards in 2004, Best News Information Series as a producer of Venture at the 20th Gemini Awards in 2005, Best Reality Program or Series as a producer of Venture's "The Big Switcheroo" at the 21st Gemini Awards in 2006, and Best Lifestyle/Practical Information Segment for Fortune Hunters at the 23rd Gemini Awards in 2008.

References

External list
 
 

Canadian television reporters and correspondents
Living people
Canadian women television journalists
Toronto Metropolitan University alumni
Canadian business and financial journalists
Women business and financial journalists
Year of birth missing (living people)